Seminole Municipal Airport  is a city-owned airport three miles north of Seminole, in Seminole County, Oklahoma. The National Plan of Integrated Airport Systems for 2011–2015 called it a general aviation facility.

Most U.S. airports use the same three-letter location identifier for the FAA and IATA, but this airport is SRE to the FAA and has no IATA code (Sucre Airport in Sucre, Bolivia has IATA code SRE).

Facilities
Seminole Municipal Airport covers 220 acres (89 ha) at an elevation of 1,023 feet (312 m). It has two runways: 16/34 is 5,004 by 75 feet (1,525 x 23 m) asphalt; 5/23 is 2,000 by 150 feet (610 x 46 m) turf.

In the year ending June 21, 2011 the airport had 8,550 aircraft operations, average 23 per day: 99% general aviation and 1% military. 22 aircraft were then based at the airport: 91% single-engine, 4.5% multi-engine, and 4.5% helicopter.

References

External links 
 Airport page at City of Seminole website
 Seminole Municipal Airport (SRE) at Oklahoma Aeronautics Commission
 Aerial image as of February 1995 from USGS The National Map
 

Airports in Oklahoma
Buildings and structures in Seminole County, Oklahoma